Sir Hugh Seymour Walpole, a 20th-century English novelist, had a large and varied output. Between 1909 and 1941 he wrote thirty-six novels, five volumes of short stories, two original plays and three volumes of memoirs. His range included disturbing studies of the macabre, children's stories and historical fiction, most notably his "Herries" series, set in the Lake District.

Books

Book series 

Some of Walpole's stories were parts of series with related themes:
The London Novels were Fortitude, The Duchess of Wrexe, The Green Mirror, The Captives, The Young Enchanted, Wintersmoon, Hans Frost and Captain Nicholas.
Scenes from Provincial Life included The Cathedral, The Old Ladies, Harmer John and The Inquisitor.
The Herries Chronicle comprises Rogue Herries, Judith Paris, The Fortress and Vanessa. Two later Herries books were The Bright Pavilions and Katherine Christian.
The Jeremy stories were Jeremy, Jeremy and Hamlet and Jeremy at Crale.
Four Fantastic Tales were Maradick at Forty, Prelude to Adventure, Portrait of a Man with Red Hair and Above the Dark Circus.

Short stories
The following stories appeared in the Windsor Magazine :

 The Dog and the Dragon in Reminiscence October 1923
 Red Amber December 1923
 The Garrulous Diplomatist December 1924
 The Adventure of Mrs Farbman January 1925
 The Adventure of the Imaginative Child February 1925
 The Happy Optimist March 1925
 The Dyspeptic Critic April 1925
 The Man Who Lost His Identity May 1925
 The Adventure of the Beautiful Things June 1925
 The War Babies are Growing Up ! November 1934

Other works

Plays 
 The Young Huntress, 1933
 The Cathedral (adaptation of his 1922 novel), 1936
 The Haxtons, 1939

Editor 
In 1932 Walpole edited The Waverley Pageant: Best Passages from the Novels of Sir Walter Scott. In 1937 he edited a compilation of short stories, A Second Century of Creepy Stories (Hutchinson, 1937), by a range of writers including Guy de Maupassant, M. R. James, Henry James, Walter de la Mare, Oliver Onions, Walpole himself ("Tarnhelm") and twenty-one others.

Notes

Sources

"Hugh Walpole", Contemporary Authors Online, Gale Group. Retrieved 23 November 2013 
"Walpole, Sir Hugh Seymour", Who Was Who, A & C Black, 1920–2007 online edition, Oxford University Press, December 2007. Retrieved 23 November 2013 
"Hugh Walpole", WorldCat. Retrieved 5 January 2014

External links
 

20th-century British writers